Andrea Micheletti (born 22 June 1991) is an Italian rower. He competed in the men's lightweight double sculls event at the 2016 Summer Olympics.

References

External links
 

1991 births
Living people
Italian male rowers
Olympic rowers of Italy
Rowers at the 2016 Summer Olympics
Place of birth missing (living people)
Mediterranean Games bronze medalists for Italy
Mediterranean Games medalists in rowing
Competitors at the 2013 Mediterranean Games
Rowers of Fiamme Oro
World Rowing Championships medalists for Italy
20th-century Italian people
21st-century Italian people